The Green Bay Packers are unique in having their market area cover two media markets, both Green Bay and Milwaukee, and blackout policies for the team apply within both areas, though they rarely come into effect due to strong home attendance and popularity.

The Packers' flagship station is, 
WRNW-FM with the games airing in Green Bay on WIXX-FM. Wayne Larrivee is the play-by-play announcer and Larry McCarren is the color analyst. Larrivee joined the team after many years as the Chicago Bears' announcer. Jim Irwin and Max McGee were the longtime radio announcers before Larrivee and McCarren.

Preseason coverage was produced by CBS, using the NFL on CBS graphics package with the CBS eyemark replaced by the Packers logo. The graphics are currently used from NBC Sunday Night Football, with the Packers TV Network logo. The TV play-by-play announcer, Kevin Harlan, is the son of former Packers president Bob Harlan. In the 2008 pre-season, all of the Packers preseason games on the statewide network were produced and aired in high definition, while two games on WTMJ instead aired over WVTV (Channel 18) because of Channel 4's obligations to 2008 Summer Olympics coverage in Milwaukee.

ESPN Monday Night Football games, both pre-season and season, are broadcast over the air on Fox affiliate WLUK (Channel 11) in Green Bay and ABC affiliate WISN (Channel 12) in Milwaukee, while the stations airing Packers games in the NFL Network Run to the Playoffs package have varied.

The team's intra-squad Lambeau scrimmage at the beginning of the season, which is marketed as Packers Family Night, is broadcast by WTMJ-TV (Channel 4) in Milwaukee, and produced by WGBA (Channel 26) in Green Bay, both NBC affiliates which broadcast the bulk of the team's regular season games.

See also
 Packers Radio Network

Green Bay Packers
broadcasters